Seben District is a district of the Bolu Province of Turkey. Its seat is the town of Seben. Its area is 683 km2, and its population is 4,767 (2021). Seben is an attractive district known for its apples.

Composition
There is one municipality in Seben District:
 Seben

There are 29 villages in Seben District:

 Alpagut
 Bakırlı
 Bozyer
 Çeltikderesi
 Dedeler
 Değirmenkaya
 Dereboyu
 Ekiciler
 Gerenözü
 Gökhaliller
 Güneyce
 Haccağız
 Hoçaş
 Kabakköy
 Karaağaç
 Kaşbıyıklar
 Kesenözü
 Kızık
 Korucuk
 Kozyaka
 Kuzgölcük
 Musasofular
 Nimetli
 Solaklar
 Susuz
 Tazılar
 Tepeköy
 Yağma
 Yuva

References

Districts of Bolu Province